Naval Base Gilbert Islands were naval bases built by the United States Navy in 1943 to support the World War II effort. The bases were located on in the Gilbert Islands in the Central Pacific Ocean. The bases were built as part of the many advance bases in the island-hopping campaign towards the Empire of Japan. The largest base was the Naval Base Tarawa. At Tarawa the Navy built a seaport, supply depots, a small ship repair depot, Carrier Aircraft Service Unit, seaplane base and two airbases. Construction started after the Battle of Tarawa ended on November 23, 1943, part of Operation Galvanic. The bases were built by the US Navy's Seabees, Naval Construction Battalions. After the war the bases were abandoned. Some of the airfields became civilian airports.

Naval Base Gilbert Islands
Naval Base Tarawa, a very large base.
Tarawa Seaplane base
VP-13 with Consolidated PBY Catalina
VP-202 with Martin PBM Mariner
Mullinix Field, became Bonriki International Airport
Hawkins Field, abandoned and after the war.
Naval Base Abemama
O’Hare Field after war became Abemama Airport
 Naval Base Makin on Makin Island 
Makin Airfield became Butaritari Airport

Gallery

See also

US Naval Advance Bases
Battle of Tarawa order of battle
Gilbert Islands naval order of battle
Makin Airfield  Gilbert Islands

References

Naval Base Tarawa
Naval Stations of the United States Navy
Closed installations of the United States Navy
1943 establishments in Oceania
1945 disestablishments in Oceania
Military installations established in 1943
Military installations closed in 1945